The KrAZ-214 is an off-road truck 6x6 for extreme operations. It was manufactured at the YaMZ plant from 1956-1959, after which production was moved to KrAZ. The model line was the successor to the YaG-10 trucks.

Technical characteristics 
Engine: 6.97 L diesel 6 cyl.
Power: 205 PS /2000rpm
Torque: 765 Nm /1300rpm
Top speed: 55 mph

Variants 
 KrAZ-214 (КрАЗ-214): cargo truck. Produced 1959-1963.
 KrAZ-214B (КрАЗ-214Б): Updated version of KrAZ-214 with improved suspension and a 24 volt electrical system. Produced 1963-1967.
 E-305V (Э-305В) - military excavator on KrAZ-214 chassis

Operators

Former operators
  - Soviet Armed Forces

References

Military trucks of the Soviet Union
Military vehicles introduced in the 1950s